Luigi Gasparotto (31 May 1873 – 29 June 1954) was an Italian lawyer and politician.

He served several times as Minister and was one of the founders of the Labour Democratic Party. He was also president of Fiera Milano.

Biography
Gasparotto was born in Sacile, Province of Pordenone. His father Leopoldo Gasparotto, a small landowner and Garibaldian, educated him to democratic and secular ideals. Moving to Milan, he practiced the profession of lawyer and frequented the Lombard Democratic Society. Since 1897 he adhered to Freemasonry, attending the Milanese institution.

He opposed to the Italian military in intervention in Libia in 1911-12 and was elected deputy of the Kingdom of Italy in Milan in 1913. Combatant of the First World War, he was decorated with three silver medals for military valor. After the war he was among the founders of the National Combatants Association and promoted a movement of ex-combatants called "National Renewal", of radical inspiration with which he was reconfirmed in the Chamber of Deputies in 1919, and again in June 1921 with Social Democracy.

He was Minister of War in July 1921 in the Bonomi I government, during which he promoted the rite of the Unknown Soldier, until February 1922. Elected deputy again in 1924, he was vice president of the Chamber. Although he did not adhere to the Aventine Secession against Mussolini he was part of the opposition in the courtroom and resigned as vice president in December 1926. After the legislature ended in 1928, he withdrew from political life.

After the armistice of Cassibile, he was part of a committee of anti-fascists that tried to organize, without success, the defense of Milan against the Germans. His son Leopoldo became a Resistance leader, until he was captured by the Nazis in December 1943 and killed in Fossoli on 22 June 1944.

In the transitional constitutional period he was Minister of Air Force from January to June 1945. At the end of the Second World War, he was called to the National Council and in December 1945 he was Minister of post-war assistance in the 1st De Gasperi government until July 1946. Elected Deputy to the Constituent Assembly in June 1946 for the National Democratic Union, he was the first minister of defence, born with the incorporation of three ministries (War, Navy and Air Force) into the III De Gasperi government (February – May 1947).

Senator of the Republic by appointment, in the I legislature (1948), after the resignation of Giuseppe Paratore he was proposed to the Presidency of the Senate, but he renounced the candidacy shortly before the vote. He was vice-president of the mixed group until 1953.

He died on 29 June 1954 in his country house in Cantello.

References

External links

1873 births
1954 deaths
People from Sacile
Labour Democratic Party politicians
Italian Ministers of Defence
Deputies of Legislature XXIV of the Kingdom of Italy
Deputies of Legislature XXV of the Kingdom of Italy
Deputies of Legislature XXVI of the Kingdom of Italy
Deputies of Legislature XXVII of the Kingdom of Italy
Members of the National Council (Italy)
Members of the Constituent Assembly of Italy
Senators of Legislature I of Italy
Bonomi III Cabinet
Politicians of Friuli-Venezia Giulia
20th-century Italian lawyers
Italian Freemasons
19th-century Italian lawyers